The Municipal Council of Beau-Bassin Rose-Hill also known as Municipality is the local authority responsible for the administration of the town of Beau-Bassin Rose-Hill, Plaines Wilhems District, Mauritius. The current Mayor is Mr Jean Didier David UTILE   and the Deputy Mayor is Mr Nazir Mohamad Ameen JUNGGEE

External links

References 

Beau Bassin-Rose Hill
Local government in Mauritius